Waratah St is the tenth studio album by Australian country music artist John Williamson. The album was released in September 1991 and peaked at number 14 on the ARIA Charts. The album was certified platinum.

At the ARIA Music Awards of 1992, the album was nominated for ARIA Award for Best Country Album and Best Adult Contemporary Album.

Track listing

Charts

Certifications

Release history

References

1991 albums
John Williamson (singer) albums
Festival Records albums